The 2013 Southern Illinois Salukis football team represented Southern Illinois University Carbondale as a member of the Missouri Valley Football Conference (MVFC) during the 2013 NCAA Division I FCS football season. Led by sixth-year head coach Dale Lennon, the Salukis compiled an overall record of 7–5 with a mark of 5–3 in conference play, placing in a four-way tie for second in the MVFC. Southern Illinois played home games at Saluki Stadium in Carbondale, Illinois.

Schedule

^Game aired on a tape delayed basis

References

Southern Illinois
Southern Illinois Salukis football seasons
Southern Illinois Salukis football